Brickellia pavonii is a Mexican species of flowering plants in the family Asteraceae. It is native to central Mexico in the states of Oaxaca and Veracruz.

The species is named for Spanish botanist Hipólito Ruiz López, 1754 – 1816.

References

External links
Photo of herbarium specimen at Missouri Botanical Garden, collected in Oaxaca, isolectotype of Eupatorium setiferum

pavonii
Flora of Mexico
Plants described in 1882